Ngaliema is a municipality (commune) in the Lukunga District of Kinshasa, the capital city of the Democratic Republic of the Congo.

Location

Ngaliema is situated in the west of Kinshasa. It stretches south towards Mont Ngaliema and along the main road linking Kinshasa and the city of Matadi in Bas-Congo.
The boundary between Ngaliema and the Mont Ngafula commune is defined by the Lukunga River.

Buildings

In addition to the communities of Binza Ozone, Binza Météo, Binza Delvaux and Binza I.P.N., the area also accommodates:
 The  (Marble Palace): built as a Presidential guests' residence under Mobutu Sese Seko, it was the official residence of President Laurent-Désiré Kabila. It is in his private office at the Marble palace that Kabila was assassinated, allegedly by one of his bodyguards.
 The  (African Union village) compound: built when Kinshasa was the host of a summit of heads of states of the Organisation of African Unity, the sprawling compound has paid host to many official functions. Most recently, it has become the official location of the weekly meeting of the Council of Ministers, the deliberative body of the Congolese executive branch.
 The Camp Militaire Colonel Tshatshi (Colonel Tshatshi Military Compound): One of the two major military bases in Kinshasa, the base pays host to the defense department, and the Joint Chiefs of staff central command headquarters for the Military of the Democratic Republic of the Congo (FARDC). It also surrounds two previous Presidential palaces.

Demographics

Education
American School of Kinshasa (TASOK) is in Ngaliema.

See also

References

External links
Binza Rotary Club
Pictures of the gardens of the Mont Nagliema palace
Map of  Kinshasa (2001)
Map of Léopoldville (1960)
Map of Léopoldville (1954)

Communes of Kinshasa
Lukunga District